Carel Hubert Struycken (born 30 July 1948) is a Dutch actor. He is known for playing the Giant/Fireman in the television series Twin Peaks (1990–1991, 2017), the occasional guest role of Mr. Homn in Star Trek: The Next Generation (1987–1992), and the household butler Lurch in the 1990’s Addams Family films. He also appeared in the films Gerald's Game (2017) and Doctor Sleep (2019).

Early life
Struycken was born on 30 July 1948 in The Hague, Netherlands. When he was 4 years old, his family moved to Curaçao in the Netherlands Antilles. There, at age 15, he composed several Caribbean waltzes. At 16, he returned to his home country, where he finished secondary school. He graduated from the directing program at the film school in Amsterdam. After that, he spent a year at the American Film Institute, in Los Angeles.

Career 

In 1978, Struycken was discovered as an actor at the corner of Hollywood and Vine in Los Angeles by a woman who had abandoned her car in the middle of the street, calling after him: "We need you for a movie!". The film was Sgt. Pepper's Lonely Hearts Club Band.

Struycken played Terak in the 1985 TV film Ewoks: The Battle for Endor, a spin-off to the original Star Wars trilogy.

Struycken appeared as Fidel, Jack Nicholson's manservant, in the 1987 film The Witches of Eastwick. That same year, he appeared as Mr. Homn in "Haven", an episode of the television series Star Trek: The Next Generation, a role he would reprise in four more episodes until 1992.

In 1991, he starred as butler Lurch in the feature film The Addams Family. He reprised the role in the 1993 sequel, Addams Family Values, and the TV film Addams Family Reunion. Director Barry Sonnenfeld also picked Struycken for a small role in Men in Black.

He portrayed the mystical guide-character "The Giant" in David Lynch and Mark Frost's hit 1990–91 ABC television series Twin Peaks. He also appears in the 2017 sequel series, Twin Peaks: The Return. He appears as the "Moonlight Man" in the 2017 film Gerald's Game.

Struycken collaborated on several projects with writer and director Rene Daalder, including the 1986 punk rock musical Population: 1, which featured Tomata du Plenty, of The Screamers, and which was released on DVD in October 2008.

Personal life 
Struycken is a vegetarian and likes gardening. At age 20, he was diagnosed with acromegaly, which explains his tall height of 2.13m (7 feet) and distinctive facial features.

He and his American wife have two children. They reside in the Los Angeles area. His brother Peter Struycken won the 2012 Heineken Prize for Arts of the Royal Netherlands Academy for Sciences.

Struycken is an avid photographer. He maintains a website devoted to his spherical panoramas and shares a photography blog with Josh Korwin.

Filmography

Television series

Music videos
 1983 "Mexican Radio" by Wall of Voodoo
 1996 "A.D.I.D.A.S." by Korn

References

Further reading
Carel Struycken: Leaning Toward the Paleolithic, by Christopher Nyerges, The Backwoodsman Magazine, July/August 2013, Vol.34 No. 4, published by Backwoodsman Magazine, Fulton, Texas. Pages 26–27

External links
Carel Struycken Website

1948 births
Living people
20th-century Dutch male actors
21st-century Dutch male actors
Dutch composers
Dutch emigrants to the United States
Dutch male film actors
Dutch male television actors
Male actors from The Hague
People with acromegaly